Ioana Ciolacu Miron (born November 21, 1982) is a Romanian fashion designer. She received a Designer for Tomorrow Award from Stella McCartney, and has founded her own sustainable fashion Ioana Ciolacu label.

Early life
Ciolacu was born in Iași, Romania. Ciolacu is an only child. Her father is an architect. As a young girl, Ciolacu spent her summers in Focșani and in the Romanian countryside. In 1992, she enrolled at the Iași Waldorf School, where she got her love for nature, strong ethics, and developed her art drive. After graduating from high school, she enrolled at Ion Mincu University of Architecture and Urbanism, Bucharest, where she specialized in Architecture. While in her 5th year of study, she decided to switch her career path by enrolling at Bucharest National University of Arts, while continuing to study Architecture. She graduated in 2010 as a Junior architect, and in 2011 as a Fashion designer.

Career
While in school, Ciolacu won the European Fashion Award FASH Berlin. Right after graduation, she began working as a design assistant for landscape artist and photographer Katja Perrey at the National University of Arts. In this period, Ciolacu also developed her first ready-to-wear line with a great local commercial success. In 2012, she received a Rector's Scholarship at University of the Arts London, London College of Fashion and moved to London to study for a master's degree in Fashion Design and Technology – Womenswear. While in school, she won the Designer for Tomorrow Award, patroned by Stella McCartney, followed by a year of mentorship in which she was coached by the designer in her London studios or backstage at the designer's Paris show. After graduating in 2013, she  moved back to Bucharest and launched her own fashion label. In the summer of 2014, she first presented her Spring Summer 2015 collection at Mercedes Benz Fashion Week Berlin and in the same year she showed her collection twice at trade fair Who's Next Paris and started selling her collection on Moda Operandi and Peek&Cloppenburg international retailers. In the following year, she attended Who's Next Paris for the third time and Ciff Copenhagen with her Autumn Winter 2015–2016 collection which was presented at Mercedes Benz Fashion Week Berlin. In 2015, Vogue.com  introduced Ioana's Autumn Winter 2015–2016 in their list as one of the reference collection for the season while she released her diffusion line which promotes conscious fashion through fabric recycling and encourages local craftsmanship.

In April 2015, Ciolacu opened her online shop and launched her SS15 video campaign, called Lure. Directed by Anton and Damian Groves and produced by Studioset, the video won several awards at the Miami Fashion Film Festival. In 2016, Ciolacu develops an ethical knitwear line that comes to add up to the brand ethos regarding ethical trade and sustainability. Made in collaboration with Kraftmade, the line supports local craftsmanship and wool trade.

In 2017, Ciolacu opens it's brand first Showroom in downtown Bucharest  and starts selling worldwide through several new stockists. She launches the SS18 collection dedicated to, and entitled Bauhaus Women, accompanied by a fashion film by Horatiu Sovaiala and Raya Al Souliman. In 2020, Ciolacu enrols as a PHD student at Bucharest National University of Arts to develop a fashion sustainability project and pursue a teaching career.

Awards
Ciolacu has received the following awards and nominations:
 BigSEE Fashion Design Award 2020
 BigSEE Grand Prix Award 2020
 Awarded Best Designer at Romanian Design Week Awards 2018
 Nominated for Best Designer at the 2016 Elle Style Awards
 Awarded Best Designer of the Year at the 2015 Beau Monde Awards
 Awarded Design Award by The One 10 Years of Inspiration
 Awarded Sponsorship Award by 2014 Who's Next The Future of Fashion
 Nominated for Best Young Designer at 2013 Elle Style Awards
 Awarded Best Designer by 2013 Designer for Tomorrow Stella McCartney
 Awarded Best Young Designer 2nd Place 2010 European Fashion Awards

See also 
Sustainable fashion
London College of Fashion

References

External links
Official website

Romanian fashion designers
1982 births
Romanian women fashion designers
21st-century businesswomen
Living people
People from Iași
Alumni of the London College of Fashion
Bucharest National University of Arts alumni